Torah im Derech Eretz ( – Torah with "the way of the land") 
is a phrase common in Rabbinic literature referring to various aspects of one's interaction with the wider world.
It also refers to a philosophy of Orthodox Judaism articulated by Rabbi Samson Raphael Hirsch (1808–88), which formalizes a relationship between traditionally observant Judaism and the modern world. Some refer to the resultant mode of Orthodox Judaism as Neo-Orthodoxy.

Derech Eretz
The phrase Torah im Derech Eretz is first found in the Mishna in Tractate Avoth (2:2): "Beautiful is the study of Torah with Derech Eretz, as involvement with both makes one forget sin". The term Derech Eretz, literally "the way of the land", is inherently ambiguous, with a wide range of meanings in Rabbinic literature, referring to earning a livelihood and behaving appropriately, among others.

Appropriate behaviour and good character

In the Talmud and Midrash, there are approximately 200 teachings concerning Derech Eretz as decent, polite, respectful, thoughtful, and civilized behavior. One representative teaching is that "Derech Eretz comes before Torah" – one cannot personify Torah until he demonstrates Derech Eretz in everything that he does.

There are many more such teachings in the rishonim and acharonim (post-Talmudic authorities). The mussar literature, in fact, presents an entire body of thought devoted to the subject of middot (character traits) and "behaving like a mentsh" (refined human being, lit. a mature man). Here, the way that one behaves is regarded as an external manifestation of one's middot.

Nachman of Breslov takes the words comes before (in the above maxim) in a chronologic sense.  Thus, "Derech eretz comes before Torah", means that Derech Eretz is the original method to know part of the truth, and existed before the gift of the Torah.

Earning a livelihood

The meaning of Derech Eretz in the above Mishna is generally taken as "earning a livelihood", and the Mishna is thus read as "Beautiful is the study of Torah combined with 'earning a livelihood'". In consonance, Rabbinic opinion has a general requirement for earning a livelihood, but in such a fashion that one may also study and live Torah.

 

This opinion, in fact, extends to codification in Jewish Law: 
"[One] should work every day, sufficient for his living... and should busy himself with Torah the rest of the day and night; one who supports himself with his own hands is on a great level".

The language of this codification is representative of the general value assigned by Rabbinic literature to work in and of itself, and of the simultaneous requirement that work be seen as means to spiritual, and not material, goals. 
(See also Kohelet Rabbah 1:34). Thus, as formulated in Pirkei Avot 4:1:

Rashi, on the verse, similarly states that one who supports himself inherits this world and the next.

At the same time, in this widely quoted Mishna, the requirement to work is clearly presented with a simultaneous warning against materialism. In fact similar teachings are widespread in the Tanakh ("God made one to balance the other" Ecclesiastes 7:14), Midrash, and Rabbinic literature generally.

Even the choice of occupation is circumscribed:
The Mishna Berurah states  that working laymen (בעלי בתים) should ensure that their business activities are secondary to their Torah study, and, regardless, should set aside 3 or 4 hours each day to study — if required, limiting one's lifestyle such that this amount of study is possible. 
The popular Kitzur Shulchan Aruch more generally requires that:
"when you are engaged in business or in a trade [or profession] to earn a livelihood, you should not aspire to accumulate wealth, but pursue your work in order to support your family, to give charity, and to raise your children to study the Torah..."   
See also .

Rabbinic tradition therefore recognizes that achieving an appropriate balance could pose both practical and philosophic challenges (e.g. the requirement for secular education as opposed to limited vocational training), and the various issues are therefore widely discussed: 
(i) in various tractates in the Talmud;

(ii) in the halakhic literature;

(iii) as well as in Jewish philosophy, Hasidic thought and Musar (ethical) literature - see discussion under Divine providence in Judaism.

In Kabbalistic and Chassidic thought, also, work is seen as having positive value: Thirty-Nine Acts of Labor, encompassing all the types of work, were necessary in order to build the Tabernacle. Work became a necessity when Adam ate from the Tree of the knowledge of good and evil, causing the sparks of holiness to fall to the Other Side. All our work, regardless of its spiritual or material purpose, serves to rebuild those Shattered Vessels. One who conducts his work or business honorably is considered as though he builds the Tabernacle.

Knowledge of the natural world

Maharal, Judah Loew (1525–1609), points out that Derech Eretz is not limited to "earning a living"; rather, the concept encompasses hanhaga tiv`it, "operating in the natural world". Here, Maharal in his Derech Chaim comments on the later Mishna, Avoth 3:21, which discusses the interdependence of "Torah and flour (kemakh)" as well as the interdependence of "Torah and Derech Eretz". Kemakh, flour, clearly refers to monetary livelihood (with Torah referring to spiritual livelihood). Thus, Derech Eretz refers to more than just "earning a livelihood" and includes the knowledge and skills that facilitate success in the "world of Nature". See.

Knowledge of culture and society

Rabbi Samson Raphael Hirsch (18081888), incorporating the above, was among the first to extend the definition of Derech Eretz to include a broad knowledge of, and appropriate interaction with, culture and society. Hirsch states that:
"Derech Eretz includes everything that results from the fact that man's existence, mission and social life are conducted on Earth, using earthly means and conditions. Therefore this term especially describes ways of earning a livelihood and maintaining the social order. It also includes the customs and considerations of etiquette that the social order generates as well as everything concerning humanistic and civil education." (commentary on Pirkei Avot) 
Hirsch's conception also entails the qualification that there be no compromise on strict adherence to Jewish law. The resultant philosophy of Orthodox Judaism in the modern world, referred to as "Torah im Derech Eretz", is discussed below.

Rabbi S.R. Hirsch

When Hirsch first came to Frankfurt in 1851, he proclaimed Torah im Derech Eretz as the "banner" for his congregation, the Israelitische Religionsgesellschaft  — the phrase has since been synonymous with Hirsch as well as with his philosophy. As seen, Hirsch was not unique in extending Derech Eretz to include broad knowledge of the secular world; rather, his role was to formalize a philosophy of Derech Eretz that incorporated a practical response to modernity. 
Hirsch's philosophy has been variously interpreted within Orthodoxy.

Hirsch's Torah im Derech Eretz
In Hirsch's view, Derech Eretz refers not only to livelihood, but also to the social order, with the associated mores and considerations of courtesy and propriety, as well as to general education. Hirsch thus developed the concept of Derech Eretz to embrace Western culture while maintaining strict adherence to Jewish law (see  and ).

Worldly involvement

Hirsch seeks to demonstrate in all his writings that the combination of Torah and Derech Eretz is not only possible but necessary if Judaism is to dominate not only the religious sphere of personal and communal life, but the secular, mundane sphere as well. To Hirsch, the fulfillment of Torah—Derech Eretz—therefore requires worldly involvement and general participation in society, as facilitated by the requisite knowledge.
"Judaism is not a mere adjunct to life: it comprises all of life. To be a Jew is not a mere part, it is the sum total of our task in life. To be a Jew in the synagogue and the kitchen, in the field and the warehouse, in the office and the pulpit ... with the needle and the graving-tool, with the pen and the chisel—that is what it means to be a Jew." (Religion Allied to Progress)

Secular culture and education
In Hirsch's view, Judaism must "include the conscientious promotion of education and culture". Hirsch speaks of the Mensch-Yisroel ("Israel-man"), the "enlightened religious personality" as an ideal: that is the Jew who is proudly Jewish, a believer in the eternal values of the Torah, but also possessing the ability to engage with and influence contemporary culture and knowledge.
"The more, indeed, Judaism comprises the whole of man and extends its declared mission to the salvation of the whole of mankind, the less it is possible to confine its outlook to the synagogue. [Thus] the more the Jew is a Jew, the more universalist will be his views and aspirations [and] the less aloof will he be from ... art or science, culture or education ... [and] the more joyfully will he applaud whenever he sees truth and justice and peace and the ennoblement of man." (Religion Allied to Progress)

Jewish law
Importantly, Hirsch was very clear that Derech Eretz in no sense allows for halakhic compromise. In his view, Judaism is "an untouchable sanctuary which must not be subjected to human judgment nor subordinated to human considerations" and "progress is valid only to the extent that it does not interfere with religion". He states that "the Jew will not want to accomplish anything that he cannot accomplish as a Jew. Any step which takes him away from Judaism is not for him a step forward, is not progress. He exercises this self-control without a pang, for he does not wish to accomplish his own will on earth but labours in the service of God." In The Nineteen Letters of Ben Uziel Hirsch remarked that it would have been better for the Jews not to have been emancipated if the price they had to pay was assimilation. (See also, Modern Orthodox Judaism#Standards of observance.)

Interpretation
See also the discussion on this point, in the article on Rabbi Hirsch.

As mentioned, the philosophy of Torah im Derech Eretz has been variously interpreted within Orthodoxy. The range of interpretations arises particularly in light of the tension between Hirsch's insistence as to faithfulness to Jewish law and tradition, and the challenges posed to this by interaction with the secular world.

Under a "narrow interpretation", exposure to secular philosophy, music, art, literature, or ethics must be functional. Under a "median interpretation", this exposure is permissible, and even required, for the sake of the domination of Torah values over one's worldly matters. Under a "broad interpretation" this exposure is permissible, providing a complement to ― and even a synthesis with ― Torah.

Thus as regards involvement in the secular world, the "narrow interpretation" essentially restricts Derech Eretz to a gainful occupation; permissible knowledge would be limited to functional and occupation related knowledge, and (possibly) secular knowledge that enables one to better interpret and understand the Torah. The "median interpretation" encourages the study of secular knowledge, but only insofar as this permits application of a Torah outlook and philosophy to human knowledge and culture. The "broad interpretation" permits the general acquisition of secular culture and knowledge as valuable in its own right.

Hirsch himself appears to have embraced the "median interpretation", albeit with the qualifications above. He states that "Torah im Derech Eretz, as used by our sages, means the realization of Torah in harmonious unity with all the conditions under which its laws will have to be observed amidst the developments of changing times" (Gesammelte Schriften vii p. 294). Thus on a regular basis, he quotes secular scientists in his Torah commentary. Some scholars believe that he was influenced by Hegel (1770–1831) and Friedrich Schiller (1759–1805); in fact, in a speech given in the school he founded on the centenary of the birth of the latter, he claimed that the universalistic principles of Western culture embodied in Schiller's writings are Jewish values originating in the Torah.

On the other hand, Hirsch cautioned as to the danger of scientific knowledge leading one away from God; further, his schools, unlike others in Germany at the time, taught modern (business) languages as opposed to classical languages. Famously, in his commentary to Leviticus 18:4-5  (see also Rashi ad loc.), Hirsch clearly delineates the relationship of secular knowledge and Torah, where Torah is "ikkar" (עיקר), the essential, while secular knowledge is "tefel" (טפל), secondary or supplementary to Torah. He states that "[w]e are confident that there is only one truth, and only one body of knowledge that can serve as the standard... Compared to it, all the other sciences are valid only provisionally".

His commentary on Deuteronomy 6:7 is perhaps more explicit:
"The study of the Torah shall be our main intellectual pursuit... We are not to study Torah from the standpoint of another science or for the sake of that science. So, too, we are to be careful not to introduce into the sphere of the Torah foreign ideas... Rather, we should always be mindful of the superiority of the Torah, which differs from all other scientific knowledge through its Divine origin... [Our Sages] do not demand of us to completely ignore all the scientific knowledge... [but rather] that a person [be] familiar with these other realms of knowledge, but ... only from the Torah's perspective ... and they warn us that neglecting this perspective will jeopardize our intellectual life."

Neo-Orthodoxy: the "Breuer" communities
In 1851, Hirsch was called to become the rabbi of the breakaway Orthodox community of Frankfurt am Main. This community soon became the model for "modern communities" strict in adherence to Orthodox practices, sometimes called, "Frankfurter Orthodoxy". Hirsch's son-in-law Rabbi Dr. Shlomo Zalman (Solomon) Breuer, succeeded him after his death. Wary of establishing a dynasty, the Frankfurt community did not appoint Hirsch's son to be his successor.

After World War I, in order to show their rejection of religious liberalism, followers of the community started to call themselves "Neo-Orthodox"; this mirrored the parallel movement in Lutheranism (called "Neo-Orthodoxy"). Thus, at this point, Hirsch's romantic liberalism and the values of the 1848 struggle for civil rights were less relevant – and the rejection of many elements of Weimar German culture was prevalent. Solomon Breuer and Isaac Breuer were leaders of this conservative turn by the community.

Following Kristallnacht, Breuer and his family emigrated to Antwerp, and then to New York City. Once in New York, Breuer started a congregation among the numerous German refugees in Washington Heights, which closely followed the customs and mores of the Frankfurt community. The congregation, Khal Adath Yeshurun, is colloquially known as "Breuer's". Rabbi Shimon Schwab, also a native of Frankfurt, served as the second Rabbi of the "Breuer" community, until his death in 1995. Solomon Breuer and Joseph Breuer are often regarded as Hirsch's intellectual heirs, while Schwab is regarded as aligned with the more traditional Lithuanian orthodox communities.

The Breuer community has cautiously applied Torah im Derech Eretz to American life, narrowing its application over time. Schwab warned of the dangers of contemporary moral attitudes in secular culture and literature, and emphasized that followers of Neo-Orthodoxy therefore require a strong basis of faith and knowledge, and must exercise caution in engagements with the secular world.

Schwab also frequently emphasized that Torah can never be regarded as parallel with the secular knowledge. "Torah study is the highest duty of the Jew", and "even to suggest that anything can be parallel to Torah is a blasphemy of the highest order; Torah is above all, and everything else in life must be conducted in accordance with the Written and Oral Torah." Still, entry into commerce or the professions is seen as a valid component of Torah life, to be facilitated by an appropriate secular education (with the caveat that campus life is "incontestably immoral"). "Carrying on one's professional life in consonance with the halakha is in itself a practice of Torah." One must "establish the Torah's primacy over the modes of business and professional life so that his behavior transforms even that 'mundane' portion of his life into a sanctification."

The community is positioned ideologically outside of both Modern Orthodoxy and Haredi Judaism ("Ultra-Orthodoxy"). As regards Haredi Judaism, Schwab acknowledged that although Neo-Orthodoxy is not the path openly espoused by the majority of today's Roshei Yeshiva, the "Torah Only" and Torah Im Derech Eretz camps can exist side-by-side. "As long as one is prompted solely by Yiras Shamayim ("fear of Heaven") and a search for truth, each individual has a choice as to which school he should follow." Practically, the community is fully engaged with haredi Agudath Yisrael of America, while it shuns the more modern Orthodox Union.

The movement is somewhat distant from Modern Orthodoxy. Schwab regards Modern Orthodoxy as having misinterpreted Hirsch's ideas: regarding standards of halakha as well as the relative emphasis of Torah versus secular; see discussion under Torah Umadda. Further, Breuer, influenced by Hirsch's philosophy on Austritt (secession), "could not countenance recognition of a non-believing body as a legitimate representative of the Jewish people". For this reason, he was "unalterably opposed to the Mizrachi movement, which remained affiliated with the World Zionist Organization and the Jewish Agency".

Contemporary influence
Torah im Derech Eretz remains influential as a philosophy in Orthodox Judaism. Although usually associated with the "Breuer" community of Washington Heights, the philosophy remains an important influence in Modern Orthodox Judaism and, to some extent, in Haredi Judaism. (See also Divine Providence for discussion of derech eretz in contemporary Orthodox Judaism.)

Modern Orthodoxy
Torah im Derech Eretz is a major source of ideology for Modern Orthodoxy, particularly regarding the synthesis of Judaism and secular culture. Organizations on the left of Modern Orthodoxy have embraced the "broad interpretation", although critics say that, philosophical issues aside, their "relatively relaxed stance" in halakha in fact positions them outside the realm of Torah im Derech Eretz.

Further to the right, the "broad interpretation" is largely identical with Torah Umadda—Torah and secular knowledge—a philosophy of Modern Orthodoxy closely associated with Yeshiva University, which aims at synthesizing Torah learning and secular knowledge within the personality. The two are nevertheless distinct in terms of emphasis. Under Torah Umadda, "[w]e prefer to look upon science and religion as separate domains..." (Samuel Belkin, inaugural address, 1943), whereas Torah im Derech Eretz, aims at the domination of Torah over secular knowledge and the application of Torah thought to secular knowledge. See further under Torah Umadda.

Neo-Orthodoxy
As above, the "Breuer" community continues to closely apply the philosophy. However, since World War II, the community, has moved away from the "median interpretation" toward the "narrow interpretation", as above. Rabbi Breuer saw the risk of misinterpretation of his grandfather's ideas (and confusion with Torah Umadda) especially post-war. He repeatedly stated that compromising on Jewishness and halakha was at variance with Torah im Derech Eretz, and emphasized the distinction between Modern Orthodoxy and Neo-Orthodoxy as regards the relationship between Torah and secular. "Rabbi Hirsch's fight was not for balance and not for reconcilement, nor for synthesis and certainly not for parallel power, but for domination – for the true and absolute domination of the divine precept over the new tendencies" (Isaac Breuer, Hirsch's grandson). See further in the article on Rabbi Hirsch and additionally under Modern Orthodoxy.

Haredi Judaism

Today, the Haredi "Yeshiva communities" adhere to the "narrow interpretation" as an educational philosophy. Torah im Derech Eretz was the basic idea that shaped the curriculum of the Beis Yaakov school system, and continues to be influential. (In fact, in her Seminary in Kraków, Sarah Schenirer taught Rav Hirsch's writings in German. The (German-born) teachers spoke German and the Polish students learned German.) Similarly, the "narrow interpretation" guides the curricula at boys' high schools.

Other Haredi communities, the "Torah only" school, are further distant from Torah im Derech Eretz. Since World War II there has been an ideological tendency in that camp to devote all intellectual capabilities to Torah study only—in schools, yeshivot and kollels. Thus, the optimum course to be adopted in all cases is to devote oneself to full-time Torah learning for as long as possible; "to go out into the world is a course to be adopted only when there is no other alternative". Here, the Hirschian model is seen as horaat sha'ah, a "time-specific teaching" intended to apply to the special circumstances of Western Europe in the 1800s. (Note that Hirsch himself addressed this contention: "Torah im Derech Eretz ... is not part of troubled, time-bound notions; it represents the ancient, traditional wisdom of our sages that has stood the test everywhere and at all times." (Gesammelte Schriften vi p. 221); see further under Joseph Breuer.)

References

Further reading
Torah im Derech Eretz
Berman, Saul J. Diverse Orthodox Attitudes to Torah U'Maddah, Edah
Blau, Yosef  , Torah U'Madda, Volume 1: 1989
Breitowitz, Yitzchok Choosing a Profession: Torah Considerations part I, part II, darchenoam.org
 Forsythe, Jeff Derech Eretz: Civil, Polite and Thoughtful Behavior, shemayisrael.com
 Rothstein, Gidon Maharal on Avot, rjconline.org
 Schnall, David Six Days Shall You Toil: Classic Jewish Work Values, The Torah u-Madda Journal (10/2001)
 Taubes M. The value of work, Parshas Yitro in The Practical Torah
 Waxman, Chaim. Dilemmas of modern orthodoxy: sociological and philosophical, Judaism, Winter, 1993

Rabbi S.R. Hirsch
 Bodenheimer, Ernst Rabbi Joseph Breuer: The Rav of Frankfurt, U.S.A., Jewish Observer
 Carmell, Aryeh Torah Im Derech Eretz, jct.ac.il
 Chamiel, Ephraim The Middle way - The Emergence of Modern Religious Trends in Nineteenth-Century Judaism, Academic Studies Press, Brighton, 2014, Vol I, pp. 392–446. 
 Chamiel Ephraim, The Dual Truth - Studies on Nineteenth-Century Modern Religious Thought and its Influence on Twentieth-Century Jewish Philosophy, Academic Studies Press, Brighton, 2019, Vol I' pp. 1–72.
 Chevroni, M. The Contribution of German Chareidim to the New Yishuv, Deiah veDibur
 Drachman, Bernard Hirsch, Samson Raphael, jewishencyclopedia.com
 Frankel, Pinchas On the Breuer Kehilla, ou.org
 Hirsch, Samson Raphael The Nineteen Letters Translated by Karin Paritzky, annotated by Rabbi Joseph Elias, Philip Feldheim (1994) .
 Hirsch, Samson Raphael Religion Allied to Progress, in Collected Writings of Rabbi Samson Raphael Hirsch, Philip Feldheim (1996) 
 Jacobs, Louis Samson Raphael Hirsch: The Father of Neo-Orthodoxy in The Jewish Religion: A Companion, Oxford University Press (1995) 
 Kaplan, Lawrence Revisionism and the Rav: The Struggle for the Soul of Modern Orthodoxy, Judaism, Summer, 1999
 Katzenellenbogen, Raphael Rabbi Samson Raphael Hirsch, His Teachings and Philosophy (Hebrew), daat.ac.il
 Klugman, Rabbi Eliyahu Meir Rabbi Samson Raphael Hirsch, architect of Judaism for the modern world, Mesorah (1996) 
 Levi, Yehuda "Torah Study", Philipp Feldheim Inc, (1990)  (see especially Parts 1 & 7)
 Levi, Yehuda Rabbi Samson Raphael Hirsch as a guide for our generation (Hebrew), daat.ac.il
 Plaut, Mordechai The "Torah Only" Attitude to Torah Im Derech Eretz, Deiah veDibur
 Plaut, Mordechai The Call to Stand Firm Against "Chareidi Yeshiva High Schools", Deiah veDibur
 Schwab S. "These and Those" and "Torah im Derech Eretz – a Second View" in Selected Essays, CIS Publishers, (1994) 
Segal, Eliezer Rabbi Samson Raphael Hirsch and Neo-Orthodoxy, ucalgary.ca
 Sofer D. Rav Shimshon Raphael Hirsch, Yated Neeman
 Weinberg Y. Y. The Teachings of Rabbi Samson Raphael Hirsch(Hebrew), daat.ac.il

Jewish philosophy
Orthodox Judaism